Mary Palmer (née Reynolds; 9 February 1716 – 27 May 1794) was a British  author from Devon who wrote Devonshire Dialogue, once considered the "best piece of literature in the vernacular of Devon." She was the mother of painter Theophila Gwatkin and sister of the artists Sir Joshua Reynolds and Frances Reynolds and of the pamphleteer Elizabeth Johnson.

Origins
Mary was the eldest daughter and third child of Samuel Reynolds, master of the Plympton Earl grammar school, Devonshire, by his wife, Theophila Potter.  She was seven years older than her brother Joshua Reynolds and her fondness for drawing is said to have influenced him when a boy.  In 1740 she provided £60, half of the premium paid to Thomas Hudson the portrait-painter, for Joshua's pupilage, and 9 years later advanced money for his expenses in Italy.  Joshua Reynolds painted two portraits of his sister Mary, one made about 1747, the other when she was aged about 60 years of age. Both portraits descended to her great-grandson, George Stawell of Great Torrington.

Their other siblings included the artist Frances Reynolds and Elizabeth Johnson.

Devonshire Dialogue
Mary Palmer was the author of Devonshire Dialogue, considered by the Dictionary of National Biography in 1895 to be the "best piece of literature in the vernacular of Devon". It gives an account of the customs, characters and dialect unique to western England. Written in the middle of the 18th century, it was shown to friends and extracts were published in periodicals during her lifetime, without being attributed to her. A portion appeared in 1837 with a glossary by her grandson James Frederick Palmer (1803–1871), son of John Palmer. A complete version was edited by her daughter Theophila Gwatkin in 1839, and another edition was published in 1869.

Marriage
On 18 July 1740 Mary Reynolds married  John Palmer (1708–1770) of Great Torrington, Devonshire, a lawyer who served thrice as Mayor of Great Torrington. In 1752 he built a house in Great Torrington now known as Palmer House, and it was there that Dr. Samuel Johnson stayed with the Palmers when visiting Devonshire with Sir Joshua Reynolds.

Children
John and Mary Palmer had five children, two sons and three daughters:
Joseph Palmer (1749–1829), Dean of Cashel, and author of A Four Months' Tour in France. He resided at Beam House, Great Torrington.
John Palmer (1752–1827), Honorary Canon of Lincoln Cathedral
Mary II Palmer (1750–1820), who together with her sister Offy spent much time in London with their uncle, Sir Joshua Reynolds. He had great affection for them, painted their portraits, and bequeathed Mary nearly £100,000 in his will. In 1792 she married Murrough O'Brien, 5th Earl of Inchiquin (1726–1808), later 1st Marquis of Thomond. Mary died without issue in 1820 and left as her heir her brother John Palmer.
Theophila ('Offy') Palmer (1757–1848) married in 1781 Robert Lovell Gwatkin of Killiow, Cornwall.
Elizabeth Palmer (1758–1784) married William Salkeld at Great Torrington, Devon, on 26 April 1781.

Notes

References

Further reading
 Charles Robert Leslie, Tom Taylor. (1865). Life and times of Sir Joshua Reynolds. London: J. Murray.
 James Frederick Palmer. (1837). A Dialogue in the Devonshire Dialect (in three parts) by A Lady to which is added a Glossary London: Longman, Rees, Orme, Brown, Green and Longman.

English women writers
18th-century British women writers
18th-century British writers
1716 births
1794 deaths
People from Plympton
18th-century English women
18th-century English people